The Rio Pomba is a river of Minas Gerais and Rio de Janeiro  states in southeastern Brazil, one of the principle tributaries of the Paraíba do Sul.

Geography
The Rio Pomba begins in the city of Barbacena in Minas Gerais and flows south through the Zona da Mata to empty into the Paraíba do Sul between the towns of Cambuci and Itaocara, Rio de Janeiro. Its main tributaries are the rivers Piau, Xopotó, Pardo, and Formoso. The main cities along its banks are Cataguases in Minas Gerais and Santo Antônio de Pádua in Rio de Janeiro.

Indigenous peoples
In the 18th century, Koropó speakers lived with Coroado Puri speakers along the Pomba River.

Environmental issues
The lands of the Rio Pomba basin are severely deforested, a process that began throughout the Zona da Mata during the coffee era and did not spare even the headwaters of the river. It is a factor that contributes to the degradation of the river, also affected by the release of industrial and domestic effluents. In 2003 a major spill of more than 1 billion liters of toxic waste from one industry in Cataguases caused enormous environmental damage, and the effect was detected in the Paraiba do Sul River to its mouth in the Atlantic Ocean in the state of Rio de Janeiro.

See also
 List of rivers of Minas Gerais
 List of rivers of Rio de Janeiro

References

 Map from Ministry of Transport
 Rand McNally, The New International Atlas, 1993.

Rivers of Minas Gerais
Rivers of Rio de Janeiro (state)